Dust Mohammad (also Romanized as Dūst Moḥammad) is a village in Mamulan Rural District, Mamulan District, Pol-e Dokhtar County, Lorestan Province, Iran.

Demographics 
At the 2006 census, its population was 14, in 4 families.

References 

Towns and villages in Pol-e Dokhtar County